Alan C. Hoerth is a Democratic member of the South Dakota Senate, representing the 3rd district since 2006.

External links
South Dakota Legislature - Alan Hoerth official SD Senate website

Project Vote Smart - Senator Alan C. Hoerth (SD) profile
Follow the Money - Alan C Hoerth
2008 2006 Senate campaign contributions

Democratic Party South Dakota state senators
Living people
1958 births
Politicians from Aberdeen, South Dakota
People from Burke, South Dakota